Giuseppe Abozzi (26 September 1882 – 25 November 1962) was an Italian politician.

Abozzi was born in Sassari. He was elected to the Constituent Assembly of Italy in 1946 as a representative of the Italian Socialist Party, but on 6 July 1946 he switched allegiances and joined the right-wing Common Man's Front, which he represented in the Constituent Assembly from 1946 to 1948.

References

1882 births
1962 deaths
People from Sassari
Italian Socialist Party politicians
Common Man's Front politicians
Members of the Constituent Assembly of Italy
Politicians of Sardinia